Buffaloes Over Singapore: RAF, RAAF, RNZAF and Dutch Brewster Fighters in Action Over Malaya and the East Indies 1941–1942 is a 2003 book by Brian Cull, Paul Sortenhaus & Mark Haselden. It relates the history of Brewster Buffalo and Brewster 339 fighter squadrons of the British commonwealth and Netherlands East Indies, that fought in the Japanese invasion during 1941-1942, Battle of Singapore and Netherlands East Indies.

References

History books about World War II
2003 non-fiction books